Boothsville is an unincorporated community in Marion County, West Virginia, United States. Its post office  is closed.

The community derives its name from Captain James Booth, an early settler.

References

Unincorporated communities in Marion County, West Virginia
Unincorporated communities in West Virginia